Samuel Allen (born 28 May 1943) is a Jamaican cricketer. He played in one List A and two first-class matches for the Jamaican cricket team in 1975/76.

See also
 List of Jamaican representative cricketers

References

External links
 

1943 births
Living people
Jamaican cricketers
Jamaica cricketers
Place of birth missing (living people)